Mousa Nasiroghli (Khiabani) (1947 – 8 February 1982) was a leading member of the People's Mujahedin of Iran (MEK) and the commander of its armed wing from 1979 to 1982, when he was killed in action.

Khiabani has been described as "Massoud Rajavi's right-hand man" and "second-in-command".

According to Ervand Abrahamian, along with Rajavi, he acted as the organization's post-1979 spokesman and viewed as equal to Rajavi by the outsiders, despite the fact that MEK insiders knew Rajavi to be pre-eminent.

Life and career 
Khiabani was born into a bazaari family in Tabriz in 1947, he frequently participated in the Moharram rituals. He studied physics at the University of Tehran. Trained in guerilla warfare in Lebanon, he was sentenced to life imprisonment in 1972 for his activities with the MEK, however he was released in 1979 following Iranian Revolution.

He ran for a seat in the 1979 constitutional and 1980 parliamentary elections from his hometown, however he was defeated.

On 8 February 1982, the Islamic Revolutionary Guard Corps raided Khiabani's safe house in northern Tehran and after three hours of gunshots, Khiabani and his wife Azar Rezaei along with other fellow MEK members were killed.

References 

1947 births
1982 deaths
People's Mojahedin Organization of Iran members
Politicians from Tabriz
University of Tehran alumni
Iranian expatriates in Lebanon
20th-century Iranian politicians